"Until You Suffer Some (Fire and Ice)" is a song by American hard rock band Poison. It was released as the second single from their 1993 album, Native Tongue. The song peaked at number 32 on the UK Singles Chart.

Background
The single features a remix version called the "Ice Mix" as a B-side track. The song also features a music video which has the band performing the song in a bar.

Track listings
7-inch single
 "Until You Suffer Some (Fire and Ice)"
 "Bastard Son of a Thousand Blues"

12-inch single
 "Until You Suffer Some (Fire and Ice)" – 4:14
 "Stand" (acoustic mix) – 4:12
 "Bastard Son of a Thousand Blues" – 4:56
 "Until You Suffer Some (Fire and Ice)" (Ice mix) – 4:12

Charts

References

 

Poison (American band) songs
1993 singles
1993 songs
Capitol Records singles
Song recordings produced by Richie Zito
Songs written by Bobby Dall
Songs written by Bret Michaels
Songs written by Richie Kotzen
Songs written by Rikki Rockett